The Ipuwer Papyrus (officially Papyrus Leiden I 344 recto) is an ancient Egyptian hieratic papyrus made during the Nineteenth Dynasty of Egypt, and now held in the Dutch National Museum of Antiquities in Leiden, Netherlands. It contains the Admonitions of Ipuwer, an incomplete literary work whose original composition is dated no earlier than the late Twelfth Dynasty of Egypt (c.1991–1803 BCE).

Content 
In the poem, Ipuwer – a name typical of the period 1850–1450 BCE – complains that the world has been turned upside-down: a woman who had not a single box now has furniture, a girl who looked at her face in the water now owns a mirror, while the once-rich man is now in rags. He demands that the Lord of All (a title which can be applied both to the king and to the creator sun-god) should destroy his enemies and remember his religious duties. This is followed by a violent description of disorder: there is no longer any respect for the law and even the king's burial inside the pyramid has been desecrated. The story continues with the description of better days until it abruptly ends due to the missing final part of the papyrus. It is likely that the poem concluded with a reply of the Lord of All, or prophesying the coming of a powerful king who would restore order.

Discussion 
The Ipuwer Papyrus has been dated no earlier than the Nineteenth Dynasty, around 1250 BCE but it is now agreed that the text itself is much older, and dated back to the Middle Kingdom, though no earlier than the late Twelfth Dynasty. The Admonitions is considered the world's earliest known treatise on political ethics, suggesting that a good king is one who controls unjust officials, thus carrying out the will of the gods. It is a textual lamentation, close to Sumerian City Laments and to Egyptian laments for the dead, using the past (the destruction of Memphis at the end of the Old Kingdom) as a gloomy backdrop to an ideal future.

It was previously thought that the Admonitions of Ipuwer presents an objective portrait of Egypt in the First Intermediate Period. In more recent times, it was found that the Admonitions, along with the Complaints of Khakheperraseneb, are most likely works of royal propaganda, both inspired by the earlier Prophecy of Neferti: the three compositions have in common the theme of a nation that has been plunged into chaos and disarray and the need for an intransigent king who would defeat chaos and restore maat. Toby Wilkinson suggested that the Admonitions and Khakheperresenb may thus have been composed during the reign of Senusret III, a pharaoh well known for his use of propaganda. Ian Shaw does not consider the Admonitions to be a reliable account of early Egyptian history, because of the long time interval between its original composition and the writing of the Leiden Papyrus.

Ipuwer and the Book of Exodus 
Ipuwer has often been put forward in popular literature as confirmation of the biblical account of the Exodus, most notably because of its statement that "the river is blood" and its frequent references to servants running away. This assertion has not gained acceptance among scholars. There are disparities between Ipuwer and the narrative in the Book of Exodus, such as that the papyrus describes the Asiatics as arriving in Egypt rather than leaving. The papyrus' statement that the "river is blood" phrase may refer to the red sediment colouring the Nile during disastrous floods, or simply be a poetic image of turmoil.

See also 
 List of ancient Egyptian papyri
 List of artifacts in biblical archaeology

References

Citations

Bibliography

External links 
 The Admonitions of Ipuwer, an English translation of the Ipuwer Papyrus

Dialogues
Egyptian papyri